The chief executive of the Falklands Islands is head of the public service responsible for the efficient and effective management of the Falkland Islands Government. The appointment, role and powers of the chief executive are set out in the Constitution of the Falkland Islands.

History
Since the re-establishment of British rule on the Falkland Islands in the 19th century, the governor, through consultation with the elected Legislative Council of the Falkland Islands, had almost complete control over executive power on the Falklands.

Following the Falklands War in 1982, Lord Shackleton published a report on the Government of the Falkland Islands which recommended many modernisations, including the creation of the office of the chief executive to which many powers of the governor were delegated. In 1983 David G. P. Taylor became the first chief executive of the Falkland Islands and in 1985 the Constitution of the Falklands came into force, formalising the office. In 2009 a new constitution was established which further defined the role and powers of the chief executive.

Appointment and powers
The chief executive is a civil service position, appointed by the governor on the advice of the executive council. The executive council normally makes its selection through the use of a committee and the chief executive serves a term of three years, which can be extend a further two years at the request of the executive council.

Under Section 83 of the constitution, the chief executive is officially the head of the public service on the islands and the governor can delegate some of the powers of his or her office to the chief executive. This normally means that the chief executive becomes the islands' head of government in a role similar to that of the prime minister in countries which use the Westminster system. In this role, the chief executive is responsible for the implementation of decisions across government, and the efficient and effective management of the government. This includes the generation and analysis of strategy and policy options for the consideration of the Legislative Assembly.

The chief executive is an ex officio member of the Legislative Assembly, the executive council and the Advisory Committee on the Prerogative of Mercy, and also acts as Stanley's returning officer during general elections.

List of chief executives

See also
 List of current heads of government in the United Kingdom and dependencies

References

Politics of the Falkland Islands